Veto Gap is a gap between Tobin and Gair Mesas in the Mesa Range of Victoria Land, Antarctica which provides access from upper Rennick Glacier to the Aeronaut Glacier. It was named "Veto" by the northern party of the New Zealand Geological Survey Antarctic Expedition (NZGSAE), 1962–63, because it decided that Pinnacle Gap to the north offered the better route from Rennick to Aviator Glacier.

References

Mountain passes of Victoria Land
Pennell Coast